The Somogy County Christian Coalition (SKK) was a short-lived regional electoral coalition in Hungary, formed by minor right-wing conservative parties and organizations in early 1990 to jointly contest the 1990 parliamentary election in Somogy County.

History
Founded in Kaposvár, the SKK consisted of the Alliance of Christian Democrats (KDSZ), the Holy Crown Society (SZKT), the National Alliance of Hungarian Political Prisoners (Pofosz), and later also joined by the National Smallholders' and Civic Party (NKPP).The lead figure of the alliance was archaeologist and historian Kálmán Magyar, and each member parties represented themselves in the SKK's leadership. The alliance's programme emphasized the national values and traditions, Hungary's Western-orientation, the christian democracy and a possible confederate-like integration of the former Eastern Bloc.

The SKK contested the 1990 election with four individual candidates in Somogy County and was also able to set up a regional county list. They received 0.12 percent of the votes and no seats. Shortly thereafter the coalition broke up.

Election results

National Assembly

See also
 Association for Somogy

References

Sources

Defunct political party alliances in Hungary
1990 establishments in Hungary
1990 disestablishments in Hungary
Regionalist parties
Regionalist parties in Hungary
Somogy County
History of Somogy